Existenz (stylized as eXistenZ) is a 1999 science fiction horror film written, produced and directed by David Cronenberg. The film follows Allegra Geller (Jennifer Jason Leigh), a game designer who finds herself targeted by assassins while playing a virtual reality game of her own creation. An international co-production between Canada, the United Kingdom, and France, it also stars Jude Law, Ian Holm, Don McKellar, Callum Keith Rennie, Sarah Polley, Christopher Eccleston, Willem Dafoe, and Robert A. Silverman.

The film received mostly positive reviews upon release. Cronenberg was awarded a Silver Bear for Outstanding Artistic Contribution at the 49th Berlin International Film Festival for the film.

Plot 
In the near-future, biotechnological virtual reality game consoles known as "game pods" have replaced electronic ones. The pods present "UmbyCords" that attach to "bio-ports", connectors surgically inserted into players' spines. Two game companies, Antenna Research and Cortical Systematics, compete against each other. In addition, a group of fanatics called Realists fight both companies to prevent the "deforming" of reality.

Antenna Research's Allegra Geller, a world renowned game designer, is demonstrating her latest virtual reality game, eXistenZ, to a focus group. A Realist named Noel Dichter shoots Allegra in the shoulder with an organic pistol he smuggled past security. As the security team guns down Dichter, security guard and publicist Ted Pikul rushes to Geller and escorts her outside.

Geller discovers that her pod, which contains the only copy of eXistenZ, may have been damaged. Pikul reluctantly agrees to have a bio-port installed in his spine so they can jointly test the game's integrity. Allegra takes him to a gas station run by a black-marketeer named Gas, who deliberately installs a faulty bio-port. He reveals his intention to kill Geller for the bounty on her head. Pikul kills Gas, and the two escape to a former ski lodge used by Kiri Vinokur, Geller's mentor. Vinokur and his assistant repair the damaged pod and give Pikul a new bio-port.

Geller and Pikul enter the game, and meet with D'Arcy Nader, a video game shop owner, who provides them with new "micro pods". They activate the new pods and enter a deeper layer of virtual reality. They assume new identities as workers in a game pod factory. Another worker in the factory, Yevgeny Nourish, claims to be their Realist contact. At a Chinese restaurant near the factory, Nourish recommends that they order the special for lunch. Pikul eats the unappetizing special, and constructs a pistol from the inedible parts. He sarcastically threatens Geller, then shoots the Chinese waiter. When the pair return to the game store, Hugo Carlaw informs them that Nourish is actually a double agent for Cortical Systematics, and the waiter Pikul murdered was the actual contact.

At the factory, they find a diseased pod. Geller connects it to her bio-port, planning to infect the other pods and sabotage the factory. When Geller quickly becomes ill, Pikul cuts the UmbyCord, but she begins to bleed to death. Nourish appears with a flamethrower and blasts the diseased pod, which bursts into deadly spores.

Geller and Pikul awaken back at the ski lodge, where they discover Geller's game pod is also diseased. Geller surmises that Vinokur must have infected Pikul's new bio-port to destroy her game, and she inserts a disinfecting device into Pikul's bioport. Unexpectedly, Carlaw reappears as a Realist resistance fighter and escorts Geller and Pikul outside to witness the death of eXistenZ. Before Carlaw can kill Geller, Vinokur, who is a double agent for Cortical Systematics, shoots Carlaw in the back and informs Geller that he copied her game data while fixing her pod; she then vengefully kills Vinokur. Pikul then reveals that he himself is a Realist sent to kill her. Geller tells Pikul she had known his intentions since he pointed the gun at her in the Chinese restaurant, and she remotely detonates the disinfecting device in his bioport, killing him.

Suddenly, Pikul and Geller are seated in chairs in a small abandoned church, seeing rows of pews as they come to, together with all of the other members of the cast, all wearing blue electronic virtual reality devices. Nourish explains that the story was all part of a virtual reality game he designed called transCendenZ. He tells his assistant Merle that he feels uneasy, because the anti-game plot elements may have originated from the thoughts of one of the testers. Pikul and Geller approach Nourish and accuse him of distorting reality, before shooting him and Merle to death. As Pikul and Geller leave, they aim their guns at the person who played the Chinese waiter, who first pleads for his life, then asks if they are still in the game. Pikul and Geller stand together silently, not answering.

Cast

Production 

The film's plot came about after Cronenberg conducted an interview with Salman Rushdie for Shift magazine in 1995. At the time, Rushdie was in hiding due to a fatwa having been put on his life, due to his controversial book The Satanic Verses. Rushdie's dilemma gave Cronenberg an idea of "a Fatwa [sic] against a virtual-reality game designer". Existenz was originally pitched to Metro-Goldwyn-Mayer, but they did not green-light the film due to its complex structure.

Novelizations 
 Christopher Priest wrote the tie-in novel to accompany the film eXistenZ, the theme of which has much in common with some of Priest's other novels.
 In 1999, a graphic novel credited to David Cronenberg and Sean Scoffield was published.

Reception 

The film received generally positive reviews, with a 74% approval rating at Rotten Tomatoes based on 74 reviews, with an average rating of 6.60/10. The site's critical consensus reads, "Gooey, slimy, grotesque fun." Metacritic assigned a score of 68 out of 100, based on 29 critics, indicating "generally favorable reviews".

Roger Ebert gave the film three stars out of four in his review of the film, noting its release after fellow science-fiction film The Matrix. He compared the two films, stating that while both have special effects, Cronenberg's film was stranger along with having his best effects involve "gooey, indescribable organic things".

Conversely, James Berardinelli gave the film a two out of four star rating in his review. He cites that the film had a "disjointed feel", and called it a "missed opportunity" that suffered from being released near The Matrix and Open Your Eyes, which he states did similar things that were accomplished better in those films.

Accolades 
49th Berlin International Film Festival
 Won, Silver Bear for outstanding artistic contribution David Cronenberg
 Nominated, Golden Bear: David Cronenberg

Amsterdam Fantastic Film Festival
 Won, Silver Scream: David Cronenberg

Genie Awards
 Won, Best Achievement in Editing: Ronald Sanders
 Nominated, Best Achievement in Art Direction/Production Design: Carol Spier, and Elinor Rose Galbraith
 Nominated, Best Motion Picture: David Cronenberg, Robert Lantos, and Andras Hamori

Golden Reel Awards
 Nominated, Best Sound Editing in a Foreign Feature: David Evans, Wayne Griffin, Mark Gingras, John Laing, Tom Bjelic, and Paul Shikata

Saturn Awards
 Nominated, Best Science Fiction Film (lost to The Matrix)

See also 

 Alternate reality game
 Game studies
 Simulated reality
  The Thirteenth Floor (1999 film)
 The Matrix (1999 film)
 Inception (2010 film)
 The Three Stigmata of Palmer Eldritch (1965 novel)
  Total Recall (1990 film)
 WarGames (1983 film)
 "Playtest" (2016 Black Mirror episode)

References

External links 

 
  
 
 
 

1999 films
1999 horror films
1990s horror thriller films
1990s psychological thriller films
1990s science fiction horror films
Canadian body horror films
Canadian horror thriller films
Canadian science fiction horror films
British horror thriller films
British psychological thriller films
British science fiction horror films
British body horror films
Cyberpunk films
Biopunk films
Techno-horror films
English-language Canadian films
English-language French films
Films scored by Howard Shore
Films about video games
Films about virtual reality
Films directed by David Cronenberg
Films set in the future
Films shot in Toronto
Metafictional works
Dimension Films films
Alliance Atlantis films
UGC films
Serendipity Point Films films
Silver Bear for outstanding artistic contribution
1990s English-language films
1990s Canadian films
1990s British films